John Wright (born 1976) is a former Democratic member of the Missouri House of Representatives, serving from 2013 to 2015. Wright supports expanding childhood education programs.

References

External links
 
Legislative website

Living people
Democratic Party members of the Missouri House of Representatives
People from Rocheport, Missouri
1976 births